The Syracuse, Eastwood Heights and DeWitt Railroad, an interurban rail in Syracuse, New York was established in 1859. This was one of the most important of the first lines and operated as a steam road. The company was awarded the operation rights for the Burnet Avenue route as well as the Burnet Street Car Company.

In 1889, the company had reorganized and eventually owned  of road that ran from Burnet Avenue through Eastwood to Messina Springs and DeWitt. The company went bankrupt in 1894.

References

Defunct railroads in Syracuse, New York
Defunct New York (state) railroads
Railway companies established in 1859
Railway companies disestablished in 1894
Interurban railways in New York (state)
DeWitt, New York
1859 establishments in New York (state)